Berean Bible College is non-accredited Christian college located in Poway, California, USA. It is affiliated with the Living Way Church, which is a non-denominational Christian church. The college closed permanently in 2018.

History
Founded by George and Rita Evans in September 1971, Berean Bible College started their classes in San Diego, California.

In 1991, Berean Bible College moved its campus to Living Way Church in Poway, California. Currently the President of Berean Bible College is Rev. Douglas Balcombe, Senior Pastor Emeritus of Living Way Church. The Dean of the College is Rev. Bobby San-Miguel.

In Fall 2012, Berean Bible College's first satellite campus opened in Maui; on-site classes at this campus were subsequently discontinued.  Until its closure Berean Bible College offered both on-site education at its Poway campus and distance learning

Berean Bible College was a small, close-knit community bible college.  Classes are held Monday and Tuesday evenings, with a chapel service on Tuesdays.  Distance learning courses are accessible at any time to those enrolled in the class.

In 2018 the college closed permanently.

Academics

The following information is applied to the latest period in which the college was still open.

Classes are offered on Monday and Tuesday nights. There are also correspondence elective classes that a full-time student may need to take in order to be classified as full-time. Upon successful completion of the prescribed classes and elective units required to graduate,  students are awarded an associate's degree (2nd-year student), a certificate of theology (3rd-year students), or a bachelor's of theology degree (4th-year students).

There are four major courses of study offered at Berean Bible College, including a ministerial program designed to prepare individuals for full-time service as a pastor or an evangelist. Training includes preparation in such basic functions of the ministry as homiletics, exegesis, evangelism, pastoral counseling, church administration, and conducting various types of worship services and meetings. The missionary degree aims to prepare the individual for full-time service in the mission field. It is similar to the Ministerial course except that it is intended to prepare students for service in missions, both at home and abroad. Special emphasis is placed on practical training on how to establish indigenous churches. The Christian Education degree seeks to prepare the individual for full-time service in the Christian Education program of a local church as an educational director and other related areas. Lastly, the Biblical Counseling degree trains people to view problems in life from God's perspective and will be encouraged to develop a methodology for change in harmony with the Scriptures.

References

External links

Berean Bible College

Evangelical seminaries and theological colleges in the United States
Universities and colleges in San Diego County, California
Poway, California
Unaccredited Christian universities and colleges in the United States
Christian organizations established in 1971
Educational institutions established in 1971
1971 establishments in California
Seminaries and theological colleges in California